Potassium cyanide is a compound with the formula KCN. This colorless crystalline salt, similar in appearance to sugar, is highly soluble in water. Most KCN is used in gold mining, organic synthesis, and electroplating. Smaller applications include jewellery for chemical gilding and buffing.

Potassium cyanide is highly toxic. The moist solid emits small amounts of hydrogen cyanide due to hydrolysis, which may smell like bitter almonds. Not everyone, however, can smell cyanide; the ability to do so is a genetic trait.

The taste of potassium cyanide has been described as acrid and bitter, with a burning sensation similar to lye.

Production

KCN is produced by treating hydrogen cyanide with an aqueous solution of potassium hydroxide, followed by evaporation of the solution in a vacuum:

About 50,000 tons of potassium cyanide are produced yearly.

Historical production
Before 1900 and the invention of the Castner process, potassium cyanide was the most important source of alkali metal cyanides. In this historical process, potassium cyanide was produced by decomposing potassium ferrocyanide:

Structure
In aqueous solution, KCN is dissociated into hydrated potassium (K+) ions and cyanide (CN−) ions. The common form of solid KCN, stable at ambient pressure and temperature, has the same cubic crystal structure as sodium chloride, with each potassium ion surrounded by six cyanide ions, and vice versa.  Despite the cyanide ions being diatomic, and thus less symmetric than chloride, they rotate so rapidly, their time-averaged shape is spherical.  At low temperature and high pressure, this free rotation is hindered, resulting in a less symmetric crystal structure with the cyanide ions arranged in sheets.

Applications
KCN and sodium cyanide (NaCN) are widely used in organic synthesis for the preparation of nitriles and carboxylic acids, particularly in the von Richter reaction. It also finds use for the synthesis of hydantoins, which can be useful synthetic intermediates, when reacted with a carbonyl compound such as an aldehyde or ketone in the presence of ammonium carbonate.

KCN is used as a photographic fixer in the wet plate collodion process. The KCN dissolves silver where it has not been made insoluble by the developer. This reveals and stabilizes the image, making it no longer sensitive to light. Modern wet plate photographers may prefer less toxic fixers, often opting for sodium thiosulfate, but KCN is still used.

Potassium gold cyanide

In gold mining, KCN forms the water-soluble salt potassium gold cyanide (or gold potassium cyanide) and potassium hydroxide from gold metal in the presence of oxygen (usually from the surrounding air) and water:
4 Au + 8 KCN + O2 + 2 H2O → 4 K[Au(CN)2] + 4 KOH

A similar process uses NaCN to produce sodium gold cyanide (NaAu(CN2)).

Toxicity

Potassium cyanide is a potent inhibitor of cellular respiration, acting on mitochondrial cytochrome c oxidase, hence blocking oxidative phosphorylation. Lactic acidosis then occurs as a consequence of anaerobic metabolism. Initially, acute cyanide poisoning causes a red or ruddy complexion in the victim because the tissues are not able to use the oxygen in the blood. The effects of potassium cyanide and sodium cyanide are identical, and symptoms of poisoning typically occur within a few minutes of ingesting the substance: the person loses consciousness, and brain death eventually follows. During this period the victim may suffer convulsions. Death is caused by cerebral hypoxia. The expected LD100 dose (human) for potassium cyanide is 200–300 mg while the median lethal dose LD50 is estimated at 140 mg.

People who died by suicide or were killed using potassium cyanide include:
 Viktor Meyer, 19th-century German chemist, died by suicide in 1897 after taking cyanide
 Gustav Wied, Danish novelist, poet, and playwright, in 1914
 Pritilata Waddedar, an Indian revolutionary nationalist, took cyanide in 1932 to avoid capture by British police
 Badal Gupta, a revolutionary from Bengal, who launched an attack on the Writers' Building in Kolkata, consumed cyanide in 1930 immediately after the attack.
 Wallace Carothers, polymer chemist who died by suicide in 1937 after battling depression for years
 Senior figures in Nazi Germany, such as Erwin Rommel, Hitler's longtime companion Eva Braun, Joseph Goebbels, Heinrich Himmler, and Hermann Göring
 Alan Turing, a computer scientist who died of cyanide poisoning in 1954
 Ramon Sampedro, Spanish tetraplegic and activist whose assisted suicide in 1998 provoked a national debate about euthanasia, and was the subject of the Oscar-winning film "The Sea Inside"
 Ronald Clark O'Bryan, a Texas optician who killed his son by lacing a pixy stick with potassium cyanide in 1974
 Peoples Temple, the 1978 cult suicide in (Jonestown), Guyana
 Members of the LTTE involved in the assassination of Indian prime minister Rajiv Gandhi in 1991
 Jason Altom, a promising graduate student in the lab of Nobel Prize–winning chemist EJ Corey at Harvard, died after drinking potassium cyanide in 1998
 Slobodan Praljak, a wartime general in Republic of Croatia, died by suicide by drinking from a vial containing potassium cyanide during the reading of his appeal judgment in The Hague on International Criminal Tribunal for the former Yugoslavia (ICTY) on 29 November 2017.

It is used by professional entomologists as a killing agent in collecting jars, as insects succumb within seconds to the HCN fumes it emits, thereby minimizing damage to even highly fragile specimens.

KCN can be detoxified most efficiently with hydrogen peroxide or with a solution of sodium hypochlorite. Such solutions should be kept alkaline whenever possible so as to eliminate the possibility of generation of hydrogen cyanide:
 KCN + H2O2 → KOCN + H2O

References

External links
 International Chemical Safety Card 0671
 Hydrogen cyanide and cyanides (CICAD 61)
 National Pollutant Inventory - Cyanide compounds fact sheet
 NIOSH Pocket Guide to Chemical Hazards
 CSST (Canada)
 NIST Standard Reference Database
 Institut national de recherche et de sécurité (1997). "Cyanure de sodium. Cyanure de potassium". Fiche toxicologique n° 111, Paris:INRS, 6pp. 

Cyanides
Photographic chemicals
Potassium compounds